Polona Hercog was the defending champion, but chose not to participate.

Kaia Kanepi won the title, defeating Martina Trevisan in the final, 6–4, 6–3.

Seeds

Draw

Finals

Top half

Bottom half

References
Main Draw

Internazionali Femminili di Brescia - Singles